Great Natuna Island (Pulau Natuna Besar in Indonesian) or just Natuna is the main island of the Middle Natuna Archipelago, which is part of the Riau Islands Province, Indonesia. It is also called Great Bunguran Island (Pulau Bunguran Besar).

The area of Great Natuna is 1,720 km². The island had a population of 52,000 inhabitants according to the 2010 census. The principal settlement is Ranai. The island can be reached by scheduled air services via Ranai Airport.

The island is home to three species of non-human primates: the slow loris (Nycticebus coucang), the long-tailed macaque (Macaca fascicularis), and the Natuna leaf monkey (a.k.a. Natuna pale-thighed surili, Presbytis natunae).
A small number of wild goats live on the island as well as sea birds. Over 360 species of bird have been recorded on the island.

There is a large mosque in the north-east corner of the island. The Masjid Agung Natuna was built over two years from 2007 to 2009.

On 18 December 2018, Indonesia opened a military base with over 1,000 personnel on Natuna Besar Island.

Natuna Besar has a tropical rainforest climate (Af) with heavy rainfall year-round.

References

Natuna Regency
Islands of Sumatra
Landforms of the Riau Islands
Populated places in Indonesia